Kreis Wreschen was a county in the southern administrative district of Posen, in the Prussian province of Posen. It presently lies in the eastern part of Polish region of Greater Poland Voivodeship.

History
The area around the two Polish towns of Września and Pyzdry were ceded to the Kingdom of Prussia in the aftermath of the Vienna Congress. They formed the newly created County of Pyzdry (Ger: Kreis Peysern). The administrative seat was Pyzdry.

On 11 November 1817 the border was corrected and the eastern rim of the county was ceded to
Congress Poland, Wreschen (Września) became the new administrative seat. Consequently, the name was changed to Kreis Wreschen (Wreschen County) on 31 July 1819.

Geographical features

Civil registry offices 
In 1905, these civil registry offices served the following towns in Kreis Wreschen:

List of all communities with more than 400 inhabitants (as of 1910). The table shows the traditional Polish name, the name during the Prussian administration from 1815 to 1919 and the name during the Nazi occupation.

Table of office holders

External links

Districts of the Province of Posen